Keesey is a surname. Notable people with the surname include:

Michael S. W. Keesey (born 1937), scientist and namesake of minor planet 5554 Keesey
Jim Keesey (1902–1951), American professional baseball player
Walter Monckton Keesey (1887–1970), English architect and artist